The 1978 Syracuse Orangemen football team represented Syracuse University during the 1978 NCAA Division I-A football season. The team was led by fifth-year head coach Frank Maloney and played their home games at Archbold Stadium in Syracuse, New York. This was the last year that football was played at Archbold Stadium before it was demolished and replaced by the Carrier Dome. The Orangemen finished the season with a record of 3–8.

Schedule

References

Syracuse
Syracuse Orange football seasons
Syracuse Orangemen football